Disney's Piglet's Big Game is a 2003 action-adventure video game developed by French developer Doki Denki Studio and Hulabee Entertainment, and published by Gotham Games, Disney Interactive Studios, and THQ. The game centers around Piglet and how he tries to show how he can help. The game is loosely based on Piglet's Big Movie.

Playable characters
Piglet: The star of the game. Piglet can move much faster, and is able to intimidate a monster by making scary faces. If he gets scared by a Heffalump or Woozle, he can find a Christopher Robin balloon to comfort him.

Tigger: Tigger can sneak around to avoid detection by monsters, and must stay out of their flashlight beams, he can also bounce to go faster. He is only playable in Roo's and Rabbit's dreams.

Winnie the Pooh: Pooh can walk slightly slow and must dodge Heffalumps and Woozles that he attracted with his rumbly tumbly. Pooh is only playable in Owl's and Tigger's dreams.

Plot

GameCube and PlayStation 2 versions
This game primarily features Piglet going into his friends' dreams and scaring "Heffalumps" & "Woozles" to help his friends collect valuable items.

The game starts with Piglet observing Pooh reaching for a bee hive, Roo reaching for a ball that is caught in a tree, Owl trying to remember where his memory book is, Rabbit planting his carrots, Eeyore having his usual gloomy days, and Tigger painting his house to look like him.

Piglet sees a shadowy monster called the Granosorus and is scared of it, but it disappears before his friends can see it. Even Christopher Robin does not believe him. Christopher tells Piglet to overcome his fears, but Piglet says that heroes are supposed to be big and brave, and since he is the opposite, he realizes that he will never be a hero. Piglet leaves the Hundred-Acre-Wood as his friends start to fall asleep doing what Piglet saw them doing. Piglet discovers a mysterious telescope which causes him to magically enter their dreams and begins to help them find their missing items. Pooh wants honey, Roo wants his ball, Owl wants his memory book, Eeyore wants colors, Rabbits wants his carrots to be safe, and Tigger wants his stripes after getting covered in paint.

After helping them all, the Hundred Acre Wood gets flooded and Piglet attempts to save his friends, who are trapped on islands with Heffalumps and Woozles. Once Piglet rescues everyone, the Granosorus appears, but Piglet is able to scare it off. Christopher Robin comes and after learning of Piglet's bravery, he gives everybody a picnic to celebrate Piglet's bravery.

Game Boy Advance version
After having a nightmare involving a monster called the Granosorus, Piglet runs towards his friends warning them of the monster before Christopher Robin calms him down. He explains that the nightmares can teach him how to be brave, so Piglet leaves to find out how to do so while his friends begin to fall asleep. Piglet discovers several dream portals, allowing him to enter their dreams and help them find their possessions. Every dream from the console version of the game is present in this game except Owl's and Tigger's. After helping everyone, a flood covers the woods, forcing Piglet to face his fears rescue his friends while dealing with many Heffalumps and Woozles, and eventually the Granosorus. Once everyone is rescued and the Granosorus is scared away, Christopher Robin arrives and after finding out that Piglet has faced his fears, he gives everyone a picnic to celebrate Piglet's bravery.

Microsoft Windows version
In the Windows version, Piglet pays a visit to Rabbit's house, where Rabbit is busy making soup for his friends. He decides to help collect the soup ingredients from his friends to help Rabbit finish it. The ingredients list consists of honey, thistles, milk, pepper, haycorns and a random vegetable from Rabbit's garden. Pooh was supposed to bring the honey, Eeyore was supposed to bring the thistles, Kanga and Roo were supposed to bring the milk and Owl was supposed to bring the pepper, but none of them have come back with the ingredients. After Piglet brings all the ingredients to Rabbit, everyone (except Kanga and Roo) arrives for the party, so Rabbit leaves Piglet in charge of preparing the soup. Once the soup is finished and ready, everybody gathers at a picnic table to eat, where they thank Piglet for his help.

Reception

The game received positive reviews, according to Metacritic. Ryan Davis, in a review for GameSpot, deemed the game very much superior to most children's games and movie tie-ins, and praised the voice acting, sound and art design (which features "surreal" imagery of the character's dream worlds). Davis also noted the game's gentle pace. IGN's Chadd Chambers gave both the GameCube and PlayStation 2 versions a 7.0/10, finding the gameplay simple but well-executed and easy to control and the battle system well-suited for the young target audience due to its lack of violence. He compared the graphics positively to the look of the cartoon and praised the "quite enjoyable" art direction, the real-time shadows, and the quality of the cut-scenes. While the Game Boy Advance version was given a 6.5/10, writing, "This surreal, wonderfully produced game is perfect for youngsters."

Notes

2003 video games
Action-adventure games
Game Boy Advance games
GameCube games
PlayStation 2 games
Take-Two Interactive games
THQ games
Video games about dreams
Video games about pigs
Video games developed in France
Video games scored by George Sanger
Winnie-the-Pooh video games
RenderWare games
Single-player video games